WDBW-LP (97.3 FM) is a non-commercial low-power FM radio station in Port St. Joe, Florida, broadcasting to the Panama City area. It is part of the Bible Broadcasting Network, along with Belleview-based WYFZ, Gainesville-based WYFB, Lakeland-based WYFO, and Tarpon Springs-based WYFE. WDBW's format is religious programming.

External links
Bible Broadcasting Network official website
 

Bible Broadcasting Network
DBW-LP
DBW-LP
Radio stations established in 2002
2002 establishments in Florida